Timur was a 14th-century Southern-Central Asian Turkic-Mongolian ruler and warlord also known as Tamerlane (from Timur the Lame or the Persian expression of the same meaning, Timur-e-Lang) in the western world.

Taimur or Timur may also refer to:

Historical
 Möngke Temür, or Mengu-Timur (d.1280), khan of the Golden Horde
 Several rulers from the Chinese-Mongol Yuan Dynasty
 Temür Khan ( 1294–1307), the second ruler of the Yuan dynasty
 Tugh Temür, better known as Jayaatu Khan, Emperor Wenzong of Yuan ( 1328–1332)  
 Toghon Temür ( 1333–1370)
 Uskhal Khan Tögüs Temür ( 1378–1388)
 Yesün Temür ( 1323–1328) 
 Öljei Temür Khan, ( 1408–1412)
 Köke Temür, a Yuan dynasty general
 Timur (1336–1405), the Central Asian ruler mentioned above, also known as Tamerlane
 Timur II real name Neku Siyar (b. 1679d. 1723) was a (De facto) Mughal emperor.
 Bayan Temür (King Gongmin of Goryeo)
 Khan Temir ( 1637), a Budjak Nogais ruler
 Timur Shah Durrani (1748–1793), an Afghan ruler

Modern
 Temur Babluani (born 1948), a Georgian film director
 Teymur Bakhtiar, Iranian army officer
 Timur Beg, (died 1933), a Uyghur rebel leader
 Timur Bekmambetov, Kazakh film and advertisement director
 Timur Dibirov (born 1983), a Russian handball player
 Timur Dzhabrailov, Russian footballer
 Timur Faizutdinov (died 2021), Russian ice hockey defenseman
 Timur Gareev, Uzbekistani chess player
 Timur Ibragimov, Uzbekistani boxer
 Temur Iakobashvili (born 1967), a Georgian politician and diplomat
 Temur Juraev (born 1984), a Uzbekistani football player
 Timur Kapadze, a Uzbekistani footballer
 Temur Ketsbaia (born 1968), a Georgian football player and manager
 Timur Kulibayev, Kazakh billionaire
 Timur Kuran, American academic
 Timur Mutsurayev (born 1976), Chechen singer and bard
 Timur Naniev (born 1994), Russian weightlifter
 Timur Pradopo, Chief of the Indonesian National Police
 Timur Taymazov (born 1970), a Ukrainian weightlifter
 Timur Selçuk, Turkish musician
 Timur Tekkal, German rugby union player
 Timur Yanyali, Turkish footballer

Other uses
 Timur (name)
Tamerlane (poem), 1827 poem by Edgar Allan Poe
Tamerlane (ship)
Tamerlano (Gasparini opera), 1711
Tamerlano, Handel opera, 1724
Timur, Iran, a village in Ardabil Province, Iran
 Temir komuz, a central Asian jaw harp
 Timuri, a tribe in Afghanistan and Iran
 Timurite movement, a youth volunteer organization in the Soviet Union
Amur and Timur, a tiger and goat in Russia
 The Nepali variety of Sichuan pepper

See also
 Timurid (disambiguation)
 Demir (disambiguation), alternative spelling
 Timor (disambiguation)